The Gaspee Affair was a significant event in the lead-up to the American Revolution. HMS Gaspee was a British customs schooner that enforced the Navigation Acts in and around Newport, Rhode Island in 1772. It ran aground in shallow water while chasing the packet ship Hannah on June 9 near Gaspee Point in Warwick, Rhode Island. A group of men led by Abraham Whipple and John Brown I attacked, boarded, and torched the Gaspee.

The event increased tensions between the American colonists and British officials, following the Boston Massacre in 1770. British officials in Rhode Island wanted to increase their control over trade—legitimate trade as well as smuggling—in order to increase their revenue from the small colony. But Rhode Islanders increasingly protested the Stamp Act, the Townshend Acts, and other British impositions that had clashed with the colony's history of rum manufacturing, slave trading, and other maritime exploits.

This event and others in Narragansett Bay marked the first acts of violent uprising against the British crown's authority in America, preceding the Boston Tea Party by more than a year and moving the Thirteen Colonies as a whole toward the war for independence.

Background
The customs service had a history of strong resistance in the Thirteen Colonies in the eighteenth century.  Britain was at war during much of this period and was not in a strategic position to risk antagonizing its overseas colonies.  Several successive ministries implemented new policies following Britain's victory in the Seven Years' War in an attempt to increase control within the colonies and to recoup the cost of the war from them. To that end, the Admiralty purchased six Marblehead sloops and schooners and gave them Anglicized French names based on their recent acquisitions in Canada, removing the French accents from St John, St Lawrence, Chaleur, Hope, Magdalen, and Gaspee.

Parliament argued that the revenue was necessary in order to bolster military and naval defensive positions along the borders of their distant colonies—but also to pay the debt which Britain had incurred in pursuing the war against France. These changes included deputizing the Royal Navy's sea officers to enforce customs laws in American ports. The enforcements became increasingly intrusive and aggressive in Narragansett Bay; Rhode Islanders finally responded by attacking  in 1764, and they burned the customs ship  in 1768 on Goat Island in Newport harbor.

In early 1772, Lieutenant William Duddingston sailed HMS Gaspee into Rhode Island's Narragansett Bay to force customs collection and mandatory inspection of cargo.  He arrived in Rhode Island in February and met with Governor Joseph Wanton. Soon after he began patrolling Narragansett Bay, Gaspee stopped and inspected the sloop Fortune on February 17 and seized 12 hogsheads of undeclared rum. Duddingston sent Fortune and the seized rum to Boston, believing that any seized items left in a Rhode Island port would be reclaimed by the colonists.

This overbold move of sending Fortune to Boston brought outrage within the Rhode Island colony, because Duddingston had taken upon himself the authority to determine where trial should take place concerning this seizure, completely superseding the authority of Wanton by doing so. Furthermore, it was a direct violation of the Rhode Island Royal Charter of 1663 to hold a trial outside of Rhode Island on an arrest that took place within the Colony.

After this, Duddingston and his crew became increasingly aggressive in their searches, boardings, and seizures, even going so far as to stop merchants who were on shore and force searches of their wares. Public resentment and outrage continued to escalate against Gaspee in particular and against the British in general. A local sheriff threatened Duddingston with arrest, and Admiral John Montagu responded with a letter threatening to hang as pirates anyone who made effort to rescue ships taken by Duddingston during his operations.

On March 21, Rhode Island Deputy Governor Darius Sessions wrote to Wanton regarding Duddingston, and he requested that the basis of Duddingston's authority be examined. In the letter, Sessions includes the opinion of Chief Justice Stephen Hopkins, who argues that "no commander of any vessel has any right to use any authority in the Body of the Colony without previously applying to the Governor and showing his warrant for so doing." Wanton wrote to Duddingston the next day, demanding that he "produce me your commission and instructions, if any you have, which was your duty to have done when you first came within the jurisdiction of this Colony." Duddingston returned a rude reply to the Governor, refusing to leave his ship or to acknowledge Wanton's elected authority within Rhode Island.

The incident

On June 9, Gaspee gave chase to the packet ship Hannah but ran aground in shallow water on the northwestern side of the bay on what is now Gaspee Point. The crew were unable to free the ship, and Duddingston decided to wait for high tide to set the vessel afloat. Before that could happen, however, a band of Providence men led by John Brown I decided to act on the "opportunity offered of putting an end to the trouble and vexation she daily caused." They rowed out to the ship and boarded it at the break of dawn on June 10.  The crew put up a feeble resistance in which they were attacked with handspikes, and Lieutenant Duddingston was shot and wounded in the groin. The boarding party casually read through the ship's papers before forcing the crew off the ship and setting it aflame.

A few days after being forced off of the ship, Duddingston was arrested by a sheriff for an earlier seizure of colonial cargo. His commanding officer Montagu freed him by paying his fine and promptly sending him back to England to face a court-martial on the incident.

Joseph Bucklin was the man who shot Lt. Duddingston; other men who participated included Brown's brother Joseph of Providence, Simeon Potter of Bristol, and Robert Wickes of Warwick.

Previous attacks by the colonists on British naval vessels had gone unpunished.  In one case, a customs yacht was actually destroyed by fire with no administrative response.  But in 1772, the Admiralty would not ignore the destruction of one of its military vessels on station. The American Department consulted the Solicitor and Attorneys General, who investigated and advised the Privy Council on the legal and constitutional options available.  The Crown turned to a centuries-old institution of investigation: the Royal Commission of Inquiry, made up of the chiefs of the supreme courts of Massachusetts, New York, and New Jersey, the judge of the vice-admiralty of Boston, and Rhode Island Governor Wanton.

The Dockyard Act passed in April demanded that anyone suspected of burning British ships should be extradited and tried in England; however, the Gaspee raiders were charged with treason. The task of the commission was to determine which colonists had sufficient evidence against them to warrant shipping them to England for trial.  The Commission was unable to obtain sufficient evidence and declared their inability to deal with the case.

Nonetheless, colonial Whigs were alarmed at the prospect of Americans being sent to England for trial, and a committee of correspondence was formed in Boston to consult on the crisis.  In Virginia, the House of Burgesses was so alarmed that they also formed an inter-colonial committee of correspondence to consult with similar committees throughout the Thirteen Colonies. The Rev. John Allen preached a sermon at the Second Baptist Church in Boston which utilized the Gaspee affair to warn listeners about greedy monarchs, corrupt judges, and conspiracies in the London government.  This sermon was printed seven different times in four colonial cities, becoming one of the most popular pamphlets of Colonial America.  This pamphlet and editorials by numerous colonial newspaper editors awoke colonial Whigs from a lull of inactivity in 1772, thus inaugurating a series of conflicts that culminated in the Battles of Lexington and Concord.

Aftermath and legacy 
The British authorities called for the apprehension and trial of the people responsible for shooting Duddingston and destroying the Gaspee. Governor Wanton and Deputy Governor Sessions echoed those same sentiments, but they lacked any enthusiasm for punishing their fellow Rhode Islanders. A British midshipman from Gaspee described the attackers as "merchants and masters of vessels, who were at my bureau reading and examining my papers." Admiral Montagu wrote to Governor Wanton on July 8, nearly a month after the burning of the schooner, and utilized the account of Aaron Briggs, an indentured servant claiming to have participated in the June 9 burning. Montagu identified five Rhode Islanders, in varying levels of detail, whom he wanted Wanton to investigate and bring to justice: John Brown I, Joseph Brown, Simeon Potter, Dr. Weeks, and Richmond.

Governor Wanton responded to this demand by examining the claims made by Aaron Briggs. Samuel Tompkins and Samuel Thurston, the proprietors of the Prudence Island farm where Briggs worked, gave testimony challenging his account of June 9. Both men stated that Briggs had been present at work the evening of June 9 and early in the morning on June 10. Additionally, Wanton received further evidence from two other indentured servants working with Briggs, and both stated that Briggs had been present throughout the night in question. Thus, Wanton believed that Briggs was no more than an imposter. Duddingston and Montagu challenged Wanton's assertions, Montagu saying that "it is clear to me from many corroborating circumstances, that he is no imposter."

Historian Joey La Neve DeFrancesco argued that the Gaspee Affair resulted from the desire of the colonial elite in Rhode Island to protect their involvement in the triangular slave trade, which formed the backbone of the colony's economy. He noted that the Intolerable Acts severely affected the ability for Rhode Island merchants, many of whom participated in the attack on the Gaspee, to profit from slavery and the industries which were dependent on the slave trade, such as the rum and molasses trades. DeFrancesco wrote that the colonists' "supposed fight for liberty was in fact a fight for the freedom to profit from the business of slavery", and claimed that celebrations of the incident in Rhode Island represent "New England’s historical amnesia on slavery."

Pawtuxet Village commemorates the Gaspee affair each year with Gaspee Days. This festival includes arts and crafts and races, but the highlight is the Gaspee Days parade, which features burning the Gaspee in effigy and a Revolutionary War battle reenactment, among other entertainments.

See also
 Caroline affair
 HMS Diana
 Historiography of the Gaspee Affair

References

Further reading

External links 

 The Gaspee Virtual Archives
 A History of the Destruction of His Britannic Majesty's Schooner Gaspee by John Russell Bartlett, at The Gaspee Virtual Archives
 Doing Research on the Gaspee Affair: Primary and Secondary Bibliographic Sources
 
 The Quest for the Gaspee 2003 – NOAA
 Gaspee.info, website of the Joseph Bucklin Society.
 Podcast description of the Gaspee Affair
 Gaspee Commission Documents from the Rhode Island State Archives
 Gaspee Commission records finding aid from the Rhode Island State Archives
An Act of War on the Eve of Revolution, by Commander Benjamin F. Armstrong, U.S. Navy February 2016 Naval History Magazine Volume 30, Number 1

1772 in Rhode Island
1772 in the Thirteen Colonies
Maritime incidents in 1772
Naval battles involving the United Kingdom
Naval battles involving the United States
Rhode Island in the American Revolution
Schooners of the Royal Navy
Ship fires
Warwick, Rhode Island